Iosif Solomonovič Shkolnik (30 November 1883, Balta – 26 August 1926, Leningrad) was a painter and set designer from the Russian Empire and later the Soviet Union.

He studied at the Grekov Odessa Art school.

In 1908 he exhibited in the New Trends in Art exhibition.

He was one of the co-founders of Soyuz Molodyozhi (Union of Youth). He worked with Pavel Filonov on the design of the set for Vladimir Mayakovsky: A Tragedy, a play staged by the futurists on 2 December 1913.

Gallery

References

Painters from the Russian Empire
Soviet painters
1883 births
1926 deaths